Joseph Rigano (April 2, 1933 – March 27, 2014) was an American character actor.

He often played stereotypical mobsters in films such as Casino, Analyze This and Ghost Dog: The Way of the Samurai. He is often recognized for his hoarse, wheezy voice.

Rigano was a regular cast member on Vincent Pastore's The Wiseguy Show on Sirius Satellite Radio's Raw Dog 104. He was sometimes credited as Joe Rigano.

Filmography

References

External links
 

1933 births
2014 deaths
American male film actors
American radio personalities
Male actors from New York City